The 2014 season was Sogndal's fourth consecutive season in the Tippeligaen. They finished the season in 15th place, being relegated to the OBOS-ligaen, whilst also reaching the Fourth Round of the Norwegian Cup where they were beaten by Viking.

Squad

Transfers

Winter

In:

Out:

Summer

In:

Out:

Competitions

Tippeligaen

Results summary

Results

Table

Norwegian Cup

Squad statistics

Appearances and goals

|-
|colspan="14"|Players away from Stabæk on loan:

|-
|colspan="14"|Players who appeared for Stabæk no longer at the club:

|}

Goal scorers

Disciplinary record

References

Sogndal Fotball seasons
Sogndal